Retro was a Latin American cable television network with classic programming that included movies and popular classic TV Series. It was owned by Turner Broadcasting System Latin America, a unit of WarnerMedia. Its headquarters were located in Buenos Aires, Argentina.

On March 25, 2009 Turner Broadcasting System announced the replacement of Retro by a Latin American version of the channel truTV, also owned by Turner Broadcasting System. Most of the programming from Retro is still being aired on TCM Classic Entertainment.

On April 1, 2009 at 5:30am (Buenos Aires time), the channel aired its last show, the Robotech episode "Symphony of Light". Retro was replaced by truTV at 6am.

In some countries of Latin America, some cable television companies opted to replace Retro with TCM Classic Entertainment instead of truTV.

Programming
Thunderbirds
The Dukes of Hazzard
Knight Rider
Robotech
Bonanza
Little House on the Prairie
The Outer Limits
The Saint
Columbo
The Persuaders!
Three Stooges
The Prisoner

References

See also

truTV (Latin America)
truTV

Television stations in Argentina
Defunct television channels
Spanish-language television stations
Television channels and stations established in 2003
Television channels and stations disestablished in 2009